"I'm Still Waiting" is a Curtis Mayfield composition notable for its recording by post-doo-wop era Patti LaBelle and the Bluebelles. Mayfield also recorded his version of it with The Impressions. The song was intended for Patti LaBelle and her band mates to record by Mayfield.

The LaBelle version reached number thirty-six on the Hot R&B Singles chart in 1966 and was featured on their second Atlantic release, Dreamer. The Impressions' version was recorded for their 1967 album, The Fabulous Impressions.

Credits

The Impressions version
Lead vocals and guitar by Curtis Mayfield
Background vocals by Fred Cash and Sam Gooden
Instrumentation by The Funk Brothers

LaBelle version
Lead vocals by Patti LaBelle
Background vocals by the Bluebelles: Nona Hendryx, Sarah Dash and Cindy Birdsong

1966 singles
The Impressions songs
Curtis Mayfield songs
Labelle songs
Songs written by Curtis Mayfield
1966 songs